Carl Grundström (born 1 December 1997) is a Swedish professional ice hockey forward for the  Los Angeles Kings of the National Hockey League (NHL). Grundström was selected in the second round, 57th overall, by the Toronto Maple Leafs in the 2016 NHL Entry Draft.

Playing career
Grundström made his Swedish Hockey League debut playing with Modo Hockey during the 2014–15 SHL season. Following Modo's relegation to the HockeyAllsvenskan at the conclusion of the 2015–16 season, Grundström remained in the SHL, signing a two-year contract with Frölunda HC on 16 April 2016. During the 2016 NHL Entry Draft, he was selected in the second round (57th overall]] by the Toronto Maple Leafs.

In the 2016–17 season, Grundström recorded a career best 14 goals and 20 points in 45 games with Frölunda. On 28 April 2017, Grundström left Frölunda mid-contract, using his NHL exit clause in agreeing to a three-year, entry-level contract with the Maple Leafs.

After attending the Maple Leafs training camp for the 2017–18 season, Grundström was reassigned to continue his development on loan in Sweden with Frölunda HC on 2 October 2017. He placed second on the club with 17 goals and finished with 24 points in 35 games. For the second consecutive season he was reassigned to join the Maple Leafs' American Hockey League (AHL) affiliate, Toronto Marlies, in the post-season. He helped the Marlies to claim their first Calder Cup, posting 8 goals and 14 points in 20 playoff games, leading all AHL rookies in playoff scoring.

Grundström returned to the Marlies for the 2018–19 season. He recorded 29 points in 42 games for the club. On 28 January 2019, Grundström (alongside Sean Durzi and a 2019 first-round pick) was traded to the Los Angeles Kings in exchange for Jake Muzzin. He was initially assigned to their American League affiliate, the Ontario Reign, but was recalled by the Kings on 9 March. He made his debut that night, and scored his first career NHL goal in a 4–2 loss to the Arizona Coyotes.

On 1 September 2020, the Kings signed Grundström to a two-year contract extension. With the COVID-19 pandemic delaying the North American season, Grundström remained in Sweden and was loaned to Swedish second tier Allsvenskan club, IF Björklöven, on 5 September 2020, until the commencement of the Kings training camp.

Career statistics

Regular season and playoffs

International

Awards and honors

References

External links

1997 births
IF Björklöven players
Frölunda HC players
Living people
Los Angeles Kings players
Modo Hockey players
Ontario Reign (AHL) players
Sportspeople from Umeå
Swedish ice hockey right wingers
Toronto Maple Leafs draft picks
Toronto Marlies players